Santa Barbara is an American television soap opera that aired on NBC from July 30, 1984, to January 15, 1993. The show revolves around the eventful lives of the wealthy Capwell family of Santa Barbara, California. Other prominent families featured on the soap were the rival Lockridge family, and the more modest Andrade and Perkins families.

The serial was produced by Dobson Productions and New World Television, which also served as distributor for the show in international markets. Santa Barbara was the first series for New World Television.

Santa Barbara aired in the United States at 3:00 PM Eastern (2:00 PM Central) on NBC in the same time slot as General Hospital on ABC and Guiding Light on CBS and right after Another World. Santa Barbara aired in over 40 countries around the world. It became the longest-running television series in Russia, airing there from 1992 to 2002. Santa Barbara won 24 Daytime Emmy Awards and was nominated 30 times for the same award. The show also won 18 Soap Opera Digest Awards, and won various other awards.

Plot
Santa Barbara is notable for having a central plot around which many of the others revolve: the murder of Channing Capwell, Jr. This killing takes place five years before the series actually begins, at which point Joe Perkins, jailed for the murder, is paroled and returns to Santa Barbara determined to prove his innocence and renew his relationship with Kelly Capwell, sister of the victim. Over the course of the soap, almost every major character would be accused of the murder of Channing Capwell, Jr. or find his or her life involved in the incident in one way or another: from his illegitimate son to his mysterious, presumed-dead mother.

Production

Santa Barbara was on an uneven footing during its first year on the air, with a reviewer for People Weekly writing that the series "could be the worst show on TV--ever." The series was launched on NBC with high promotion on July 30, 1984, while the 1984 Summer Olympics was airing on rival network ABC. Mark Dawidziak claimed in August 1984 that Santa Barbara was "a serial full of hammy acting, predictable story lines and atrocious dialogue."  However, creators and executive producers Bridget and Jerome Dobson tightened the show's cast among a handful of popular characters and proceeded to kill off or write out weaker links and supporting characters via a natural disaster and the "Carnation Killer" serial killer storyline. The original plotline surrounded conflicts between the wealthy Capwell and Lockridge families. Stage legend and Oscar nominee Dame Judith Anderson received a great deal of publicity for headlining the cast as Lockridge matriarch, Minx, but other than a few attempts to give her a major storyline, she was rarely seen. When the Lockridges staged a comeback in the early 1990s, the much younger Broadway and movie veteran Janis Paige assumed the part. The soap showed promise with an early Alexis Carrington-style villainess, Augusta Lockridge (Louise Sorel), but even though critics praised her performance, her storyline was suddenly dropped and Sorel left the show. She would return later on a recurring basis and signed a contract when the Lockridges were written back in as regular characters.

When a major earthquake hit Santa Barbara, core character Danny Andrade slept through the whole thing. Minx Lockridge was unfazed, saying that the 1984 Santa Barbara earthquake was nothing like the one in 1925. She was later locked in an empty sarcophagus. Luckily, her grandchildren were around to let her out and she escaped with merely a bruised ego.

By concentrating on such popular characters as Eden Capwell and Cruz Castillo, C.C. Capwell and his wife Sophia, Mason Capwell and Julia Wainwright Capwell, Gina Blake, Angela Raymond and Warren Lockridge, and Augusta and Lionel Lockridge, the program managed to achieve critical acclaim as well as slowly but surely rising ratings. The show was famous for its comedic style and offbeat writing. For example, in the July 14, 1986, episode, former nun Mary Duvall McCormick (Harley Jane Kozak) was killed by a giant neon letter "C" (for "Capwell") atop the Capwell Hotel toppling on her while she was standing on the hotel roof during an argument (this was later referenced in the American Dad! episode "Homeland Insecurity"). Despite an irate letter-writing campaign by the show's fans (and an offer from the soap to come back), Kozak was reported as saying that she had "no desire to return to SB", or in fact, any other daytime soap. Another example from 1989 involved Greg Hughes (Paul Johansson) having a dream while unconscious about Mason and Julia being aliens and being taken to "The Capwell Zone".

Crew and cast changes
In October 1987, the Dobsons were locked out of NBC studios after repeated attempts to fire the head writer, Charles Pratt, Jr. They sued, and were eventually allowed to return to the program in 1991, but ratings never recovered, even as the show won three Daytime Emmys in a row for Outstanding Drama Series.

Under new executive producer Jill Farren Phelps' tenure, most of the show revolved around Cruz and Eden. One controversial storyline involved Eden being brutally raped, and later discovering that her assailant was her gynecologist Zack Kelton, who had examined her after her rape. Zack's portrayer, former Dallas cast member Leigh McCloskey, stated that he was uncomfortable with the storyline as he felt that women had enough concerns about visiting gynecologists. After Zack's death, McCloskey returned as a new character, District attorney Ethan Asher.

Phelps left the series in the early 1990s shortly after being demoted and replaced by John Conboy as executive producer. Finally, Paul Rauch became the last executive producer (all three would later be producers on the long-running daytime series Guiding Light). Many important actors had left the series for one reason or another. Robin Wright was the first to leave, in 1988, to focus on her film career following the success of The Princess Bride the previous year.  Later in 1988, Justin Deas left, followed by Lane Davies in 1989 and Marcy Walker in 1991. Popular actress Louise Sorel was fired in 1991 because she did not want to have a romance with Dash Nichols, the man who had raped Augusta's sister Julia. Eden, Cruz, and most of the Lockridges had been written out while new characters played by stars from other shows such as Kim Zimmer, Jack Wagner, and Sydney Penny took up most of the airtime. Nicolas Coster had returned after a 2½-year absence but his character disappeared soon after as Coster could not come to terms over the lack of storyline he had gotten after such promise when he first came back. By the time Coster had resolved the issues and returned permanently, Louise Sorel was on her way out, and Lionel was paired in a romance with C.C.'s former wife, Gina.

Ratings continued to collapse as more and more affiliates dropped the program. Many affiliates began moving the show to earlier time periods, as early as 10 a.m and 1 p.m. The final episode aired in January 1993. In the finale, Sophia and C.C. Capwell moved towards a reconciliation, Kelly found love with Connor McCabe, and at Warren and BJ's wedding, unbalanced Andie Klein aimed a gun at the crowd; however, she was quickly disarmed and carried away by Connor. This was then followed by a roll-call list of the cast and crew. The final shot consisted of executive producer Paul Rauch standing in front of the camera, smashing a cigar under his shoe, and walking away.

Cast and characters

Following common daytime drama practice, over the years the producers of Santa Barbara recast original characters multiple times. By the end of the series, almost every original character had been recast, excluding only Eden Capwell and Cruz Castillo, Lionel, and Augusta. Out of those four, not one stayed with the show during through the entire run. The characters of Kelly, C.C., and Santana had the highest number of recasts, four each. Some recasts proved successful, most notably Jed Allan (C.C. Capwell #4), Judith McConnell (Sophia Capwell #2) and Robin Mattson (Gina Blake DeMott #2), but many were upsetting to fans.

The first notable departure happened when Robin Wright ended her four-year run as the original Kelly Capwell, followed by the departure of Todd McKee as the original Ted Capwell, and the exit of Lane Davies as Mason Capwell. By 1992, most of the original characters had either been recast a few times or written out, and new characters arrived on the scene, causing the ratings to continue collapsing, until the show was finally canceled. In the final episode the only remaining original actor from the pilot was Margarita Cordova as the faithful Capwell housekeeper Rosa Andrade, although many of the original characters remained, including C.C., Sophia, Kelly, Mason, Ted, Warren Lockridge, Lionel, Gina, and Minx.

Crew history 

During the first three years of the show, the main crew of SB stayed the same, with the Dobsons taking on a double duty as both head writer and executive producer. Jeffrey Hayden served as co-executive producer during the first year, and Mary-Ellis Bunim took over after him. In 1987, after the Dobsons were abruptly fired, associate head writer Charles Pratt Jr. received head writing status and Anne Howard Bailey joined him as co-head writer until 1989, when Sheri Anderson took over that duty.

Jill Farren Phelps took over as executive producer and kept the position until 1990, when she was replaced by John Conboy, although there was a five-month transition period where both were credited. In 1990, Pratt was fired and replaced by another associate writer, Maralyn Thoma, but her tenure was cut short when the Dobsons finally settled in court and returned to the series. Shortly before the Dobsons returned, Conboy was let go and Paul Rauch was brought on as executive producer in an ill-advised last-ditch attempt at saving the floundering soap. However, the Dobsons left their head writing duties in 1992, when Pam Long was hired as the show's final head writer.

Executive producers

Head writers

Ratings history

NBC usually pitted Santa Barbara against General Hospital on ABC and Guiding Light on CBS, both of which enjoyed high ratings at the time in the same time slot across all markets. When NBC canceled the long-running soap Search for Tomorrow in 1986, it launched its "NBC Daytime... It Will Excite You" campaign, which promoted their three-hour block of serials starting with Days of Our Lives, followed by Another World, and ending with Santa Barbara in most markets across the U.S. However, some markets chose to air Santa Barbara in a mid-morning timeslot, taking it out of competition with other soaps.

Although Santa Barbara enjoyed considerable worldwide popularity, it never achieved the same heights in the United States. In its debut (1984–1985) season, it finished in 11th place and 3.4, and edged up to 10th and 4.2 the next year. By 1987, however, it did begin to generate respectable numbers: it was still in 10th place, but achieved a 4.9 rating, the highest in the history of the show. (Incidentally, the 1987–1988 television season also proved to be the best ratings performance of the 1980s for NBC's daytime soap lineup, which had been in ratings trouble since the late 1970s.)

As quickly as the ratings rose for Santa Barbara, they fell just as quickly. After recording a 4.8 rating in the 1988–1989 season, the serial dropped a full ratings point the next season. Many of the stations airing the show began looking elsewhere for programming and began preempting Santa Barbara in favor of other shows. Some dropped the program altogether while others moved it to either an earlier time slot, such as the open 10:00 a.m. hour that NBC gave back to the affiliates in 1991 while some stations even moved the program to late night. In September 1992, with ratings barely hovering above a 3.0, NBC decided to rework its daytime schedule. The network announced that Santa Barbara would be cancelled at the midway point of the 1992-93 season, with the final episode airing January 15, 1993. NBC would then give the 3:00 p.m. hour back to its affiliates, and in exchange for it they would take back the 12:00 p.m. hour, which they had not programmed since Generations (which aired in the 12:30 p.m. timeslot) was cancelled; NBC had already given back the 12:00 p.m. timeslot to its affiliates when Super Password ended its run in 1989. Santa Barbara saw its place on the schedule taken by two Reg Grundy Organisation-produced game shows, a revival of the company's earlier hit Scrabble and a new program based on the board game Scattergories. Shortly before the program ended, New World Television tried to shop Santa Barbara to other broadcast and cable networks, but failed to find one that would air the show.

Broadcasts outside the United States

In Australia, the show aired from 1984 to 1994 on Nine Network.
In Brazil, the show aired from 1992 on Rede Manchete.
In Austria, the show aired on ORF from 1996 to 1997.
In Bulgaria, the show aired from 1994 to 1997.
In Cameroon, the show aired in both French and English from 1990 to 1993, on CRTV. A neighbourhood in the capital city is named after the series.
In Canada, in English-speaking Canada, Santa Barbara was carried by Western International Communications Ltd. owned stations, CHCH-DT Hamilton, CICT-DT Calgary, CISA-DT Lethbridge, and CITV Edmonton while the final season was picked up by Baton Broadcast System owned CTV Television Network stations. The series also aired in French from 1989 to 1995 to TVA for broadcast in Quebec. The stop of the series' dubbing in France in 1994 caused it to abruptly end its run in Quebec.
In China, Hong Kong, India, Nepal, Pakistan, Philippines and South Korea, all episodes aired on Star Plus from 1990 to 1999.
In Croatia the show aired from 1990 to 1998 on HRT 1.
In Cyprus Santa Barbara aired in 1992 on LOGOS TV, and in 1993 on ANT1 until 2002 when it was completed.
In the Czech Republic, it was the first American soap opera to air on television. It aired on Premiera TV.
In Egypt, the show aired on DStv from 1996 to 1998.
In Estonia, Santa Barbara aired on Kanal 2 and ended in 1999.
In Finland, the show aired from 1994 to 1999 on Nelonen.
In France, the show ran 1044 30-minutes long episodes (half an original episode) from 1985 to 1994 on TF1, and from 2000 to 2001 for 106 episodes on TF6.
In Germany, the show aired from January 4 to March 28, 1988, under its original title weekdays at 7:20 pm on RTL. 52 half-hour episodes were shown. On January 4, 1989, the show returned under its new name, California Clan and aired weekdays at 1:20 pm. The show ended on October 17, 1997, after 2123 episodes. Various Christmas-themed episodes and a storyline which featured a crossover with Wheel of Fortune were cut. From 1998 to 1999 the tm3 channel repeated the first 250 episodes. Two CDs of the music from the show were released.
In Morocco, the show aired on 2M (missing the exact date but early 1990s)
In Greece, the show aired originally on ERT2 National TV (1989), starting from episode 76, and almost after a year it was transferred to MEGA Channel (aired from 1990 to 1995). After that it was transferred on STAR Channel (1996) with 150 episodes lost in the way, then in SKY TV (ALPHA) (1997), and at last in NEW Channel when it was cancelled, leaving the viewers with the final season's episodes (about a year's season episodes) unseen. The show never concluded due to failing ratings attributed to constant timeslot and channel changes.
In Hong Kong, the show aired on ATV on its English network ATV World airing from 1989 to 1992.
In the Netherlands, the show aired on RTL 4 from 1990 to 1991, and from 1992 to 1999.
In India, the series was aired on Hong Kong-based satellite TV channel Star World from 1993 to 1997.
In Ireland, the show aired on RTÉ One from 1984 to 1993.
In Israel, the show aired briefly from 1995 to 1996 on Channel 2.
In Italy, the show ran all 2137 episodes from 1989 to 1990 on Rai Uno and from 1991 to 1999 on Rai 2.
In Japan, the show aired entirely on Star World from 1990 to 1999, and also aired on SkyPerfecTV from 1991 to 1999.
In Kenya, the show aired on KBC in the 1990s.
In Lithuania, Santa Barbara aired on Tele-3.
In Namibia, the show aired on NBC.
In New Zealand, the show aired from 1988 to 1995 on TV One and TV2.
In Norway, the show aired almost all episodes (except for the last two years) on TVNorge, from 1988 to 1998. The last 4 years the show ran the episodes were split in two half-hour episodes instead of the original hour-long episodes.
In the Philippines, the show aired on GMA Network.
In Poland, the show first aired from 1990 to 1992 on TVP2 (149 episodes), and was later bought by ATV1, aired from 1997 to 1999.
In Puerto Rico, a non-incorporated territory of the United States, it aired on Channel 18, which at the time showed American series such as Remington Steele and others in English.
In Romania, the show aired from 1994 to 2000 on TVR2.
In Russia, the show was the first American program to air there after the collapse of the Soviet Union. It aired on Russia-1 from January 2, 1992, to April 5, 1999, and from February 21, 2000, to April 17, 2002. However, only 1824 episodes were shown instead of the original 2137 episodes. Moreover, the show began from episode 217 and ended on the 2040th.
In Slovenia, the show aired on POP TV from 1995 to 1998.
In South Africa, the show aired entirely on SABC 3 from 1987 to 1998 and also on Bop TV.
In Spain, TVE1 aired 520 episodes of the show from 1989 to 1991 when they refused to buy more episodes even though the show was very popular. However, Antena 3TV bought the rights to the show and continued airing it right after it concluded on TVE1 in 1991. It aired until 1996 with several breaks in between. The show never concluded due to failing ratings attributed to constant timeslot changes.
In Sweden, the show first aired on Kanal 5 from 1991 to 1995, and briefly in 2000 on TV4.
In Turkey, the show aired on TRT-2 (TV-2) in the late 1980s (1986-1987).
In Ukraine, the show was the first American program to air there after the collapse of the Soviet Union. 
In the United Kingdom, Santa Barbara was the first, and only, American daytime soap opera to be broadcast on ITV, the UK's first commercial television network. It was launched Monday, 7 September 1987, as part of a brand new mid morning line-up, and it was intended to compete with the sunshine and glamour of the BBC's Australian soap opera, Neighbours. This was an unusual move, considering all of ITV's other daytime soap operas airing at the time were also from Australia. ITV bought the first 130 episodes of Santa Barbara and they were split into two 23-minute episodes (thus creating  260 editions), and initially aired across the network at 10:00-10:25, Monday to Friday. Less than a year later, by Friday, 15 July 1988, it was decided that the series had not been a success, and most ITV companies dropped the series. However, a few decided to keep the series going in their local area and they purchased the next 125 episodes (the rest of the first season), and they were broadcast in wildly varying timeslots between summer 1988 until May 1991, usually twice weekly. Satellite channel, Sky One, then  picked it up from the second season, and it aired on from 25 February 1991 to 29 May 1992 in an afternoon slot, before briefly switching to the Sky Soap channel in 1994. Santa Barbara was mainly shown in the 23-minute  format in the UK, although some ITV regions  broadcast it in the hour long format when burning off episodes during the early hours of the morning in the early 90s. The only American daytime soap opera that has successfully been broadcast in the UK is Sunset Beach, which aired on Channel 5 in the late 90s. Coincidentally, Sunset Beach was NBC's eventual replacement for Santa Barbara when it began in 1997.
In Zimbabwe, the show aired on ZBC TV1 from 1991 to 1997.

Awards

Daytime Emmy Award wins

Drama series and performer categories

Other categories
 1993 "Outstanding Achievement in Music Direction and Composition for a Drama Series"
 1991 "Outstanding Drama Series Writing Team"
 1991 "Outstanding Drama Series Directing Team"
 1991 "Outstanding Achievement in Lighting Direction for a Drama Series"
 1991 "Outstanding Achievement in Hairstyling for a Drama Series"
 1990 "Outstanding Drama Series Directing Team"
 1990 "Outstanding Achievement in Lighting Direction for a Drama Series"
 1989 "Outstanding Drama Series Writing Team"
 1989 "Outstanding Achievement in Makeup for a Drama Series"
 1989 "Outstanding Achievement in Hairstyling for a Drama Series"
 1988 "Outstanding Achievement in Music Direction and Composition for a Drama Series"
 1987 "Outstanding Achievement in Music Direction and Composition for a Drama Series"
 1985 "Outstanding Achievement in Graphics and Title Design"

Other awards
 Writers Guild of America Award for Television Daytime Serials (1991, 1992)
 Casting Society of America Artios Award (1990)

See also

References

External links

Santa Barbara Soap Opera - Facebook Page
 "The 1980s American Soap Opera That Explains How Russia Feels About Everything" by Mikhail Iossel, Foreign Policy, July 24, 2017

1984 American television series debuts
1993 American television series endings
1980s American drama television series
1990s American drama television series
American television soap operas
Daytime Emmy Award for Outstanding Drama Series winners
NBC original programming
English-language television shows
Television shows set in Santa Barbara, California
Television series by New World Television
NBC network soap operas